Pavol Farkaš (born 27 March 1985) is a former Slovak professional footballer who currently plays in lower leagues as a centre back.

Career

Career in Slovakia and Romania
Farkas spent three seasons with Nitra and two with Artmedia Petržalka, appearing in 80 league matches. In the summer of 2008, he signed a contract with Romanian Liga I side Vaslui.

Chievo Verona
On 3 July 2012 Farkaš signed a one-year contract with Chievo Verona, in the Italian Serie A. He was loaned to Serie B team Ternana on 16 July 2013.

Gabala
Farkaš signed a one-year contract with Azerbaijan Premier League club Gabala on 6 July 2014, leaving the club upon its completion in June 2015.

Skoda Xanthi
On 29 July 2015, Farkaš signed a one-year contract with Greek Super League club Xanthi.

AEL
In July 2016, Farkaš signed a one-year contract with Superleague side AE Larossa. He made his official debut for the club on 12 September 2016 in a 2-2 home draw against Iraklis. On 18 March 2017 he scored the only goal in a crucial home win against Panetolikos. After a decent season with 27 appearances and 1 goal he renewed his contract for an additional year. On 29 January 2018 he left the club by mutual consent.

Post-retirement
In September 2022, Farkaš joined the arriving staff of Francesco Calzona, who was appointed the manager of Slovakia. Since Calzona nor his staff were fluent in spoken English, Farkaš, an experienced international footballer with knowledge of Italian including footballing terminology, was onboarded as an on-field translator and communications liaison.

Career statistics

Career honours
Petržalka
Slovakian League: 2007-08
Slovakian Cup: 2007-08
Vaslui 
Liga I: runner-up 2011–12
Cupa României: runner-up 2010

References

External links
 
 
 

1985 births
Living people
Slovak footballers
FC Vaslui players
FC Nitra players
FC Petržalka players
A.C. ChievoVerona players
Ternana Calcio players
Gabala FC players
Xanthi F.C. players
Athlitiki Enosi Larissa F.C. players
Spartak Myjava players
Slovak Super Liga players
Liga I players
Serie A players
Serie B players
2. Liga (Slovakia) players
3. Liga (Slovakia) players
Azerbaijan Premier League players
Expatriate footballers in Romania
Expatriate footballers in Italy
Expatriate footballers in Azerbaijan
Expatriate footballers in Greece
Slovak expatriate sportspeople in Romania
Slovak expatriate sportspeople in Italy
Slovak expatriate sportspeople in Azerbaijan
Slovak expatriate sportspeople in Greece
Slovak expatriate footballers
Association football defenders
Slovakia international footballers
People from Nitra District
Sportspeople from the Nitra Region